WNGN (91.9 FM) is a radio station broadcasting a Contemporary Christian format. Licensed to Argyle, New York, United States, the station serves the Saratoga Springs area.  The station is owned by Northeast Gospel Broadcasting Inc and features programming from the Salem Radio Network.

History
The station was assigned the call letters as WZYB on May 7, 1992.  On September 1, 1993, the station changed its call sign to WNGX; it signed on in August 1994. On July 13, 1998, it became WNGN.

In 2009, WNGN announced that two new affiliated stations would go on the air: WNGB (91.3 FM) in Petersham, Massachusetts, and WNGF (89.9 FM) in Swanton, Vermont. In August 2013, Northeast Gospel Broadcasting reached a deal to sell WNGF to Christian Ministries.

Simulcast

Translators
In addition to the main station, WNGN is relayed by additional translators to widen its broadcast area.

References

External links

Radio stations established in 1994
1994 establishments in New York (state)
Moody Radio affiliate stations
NGN